The Three Wishes (Italian: I tre desideri) is a 1937 Italian "white-telephones" romantic comedy film directed by Giorgio Ferroni and Kurt Gerron and starring Luisa Ferida, Antonio Centa and Leda Gloria.

It was shot at the Cinecittà Studios in Rome. The film's sets were designed by the art director Guido Fiorini.

A separate Dutch version, The Three Wishes, was also made.

Cast

References

Bibliography 
 Poppi, Roberto. I registi: dal 1930 ai giorni nostri. Gremese Editore, 2002.

External links 

1937 films
1930s Italian-language films
Films directed by Giorgio Ferroni
Films directed by Kurt Gerron
1937 romantic comedy films
Italian romantic comedy films
Films shot at Cinecittà Studios
Italian black-and-white films
Italian multilingual films
1937 multilingual films
1930s Italian films